The 1995 FIS Freestyle World Ski Championships were held between February 6th and February 9th at the La Clusaz ski resort in France. The World Championships featured both men's and women's events in the Moguls, Aerials, Acro Skiing and the Combined.

Results

Men's results

Moguls

Aerials

Acro Skiing

Combined

Women's results

Moguls

Aerials

Acro Skiing

Combined

References

External links
 FIS Freestyle Skiing Home
 Results from the FIS

1995
1995 in French sport
1995 in freestyle skiing
Freestyle skiing competitions in France